Bahitini is a tribe of leafhoppers in the subfamily Deltocephalinae. Bahitini contains 25 genera and over 165 species.

Genera 
There are 25 described genera in the tribe Bahitini:

References 

Deltocephalinae
Insect tribes